Mikhail Nenashev (18 March 1960 – 29 August 2021) was a Russian politician. He was also a Captain 1st rank and served on the General Council of the Party of Business.

Biography
He graduated from Kiev Naval Political College and studied at the Lenin Military-Political Academy from 1990 to 1991. He then graduated from Moscow State University in 1993.

In 1978, Nenashev joined the Northern Fleet as a sailor. He then served as a lieutenant from 1983 to 1986 and subsequently became a Captain 3rd rank in 1991. He became a Captain 2nd rank in 1995 before becoming a Captain 1st rank in 1998. In September 1991, he founded what would become the All-Russian Fleet Support Movement. He was re-elected as Chairman six times.

Nenashev served in the 5th State Duma from 24 December 2007 to 21 December 2011. Although he was an Independent, he was part of the United Russia faction. During his time in office, he served as the Chairman of the Subcommittee on Military-Technical Cooperation.

Mikhail Nenashev died of cardiac arrest in Moscow on 29 August 2021, at the age of 61.

References

1960 births
2021 deaths
Fifth convocation members of the State Duma (Russian Federation)
Party of Business politicians
Kiev Naval Political College alumni
Lenin Military Political Academy alumni
Moscow State University alumni
People from Ternovsky District